Shakaiba Sanga Amaj (Pashto:شکېبا څانګه آماج) (born 1986 assassinated 2007) was an Afghan female journalist. Born in Kabul, she worked as a broadcaster for Shamshad TV Channel.

References
Shakaiba Sanga Amaj : Define, Explore, Discuss
Life Album Of Saanga Amaj - Shaheed Shakaiba Saanga Amaj

1986 births
2007 deaths
Assassinated Afghan journalists
People murdered in Afghanistan
Afghan journalists
Afghan women journalists
21st-century Afghan women writers
21st-century Afghan writers
20th-century journalists